Colin Richard Moran (born October 1, 1992) is an American professional baseball third baseman in the Seattle Mariners organization. He has previously played in Major League Baseball (MLB) for the Houston Astros, Pittsburgh Pirates and Cincinnati Reds.

Moran attended the University of North Carolina at Chapel Hill, where he played college baseball for the North Carolina Tar Heels baseball team. In his freshman season, he was named Freshman of the Year and was the only freshman named to the All-America team. After his junior year, the Miami Marlins selected Moran with the sixth overall selection of the 2013 Major League Baseball draft. They traded him to the Astros the next season. The Astros promoted Moran to the major leagues in 2016. The Astros traded him to the Pirates in a package for Gerrit Cole on January 13, 2018.

Amateur career
Moran attended Iona Preparatory School in New Rochelle, New York. Undrafted out of high school, he chose to attend the University of North Carolina at Chapel Hill (UNC) to play college baseball for the North Carolina Tar Heels baseball team in the Atlantic Coast Conference (ACC). In his freshman year, he led the Tar Heels with a .335 batting average, .442 on-base percentage, .540 slugging percentage, nine home runs, 71 runs batted in and 20 doubles.

Moran was named to the National Collegiate Baseball Writers Association Freshman All-America team, ACC Freshman of the Year, and Baseball America Freshman of the Year. Moran was named a Baseball America All-American, the only freshman to earn the honor.

Despite an injury shortened sophomore season, Moran again led the Tar Heels with a .365 average and 35 RBIs. Moran followed the injury plagued season by being selected as a second team All America by Louisville Slugger, ACC player of the year, and a finalist for the Golden Spikes Award while setting a single season RBI record for UNC, with 86 runs batted in. In 2011 and 2012, he played collegiate summer baseball with the Bourne Braves of the Cape Cod Baseball League, and was named a league all-star in both seasons. Moran led the Tar Heels in 2013 with 13 home runs, along with a .544 slugging percentage, and a .470 on-base percentage.

Professional career

Miami Marlins
The Miami Marlins selected Moran in the first round, with the sixth overall selection, of the 2013 MLB draft. Moran signed with the Marlins, receiving a $3.5 million signing bonus. He hit a home run in his first professional at-bat, as a member of the Greensboro Grasshoppers of the Class A South Atlantic League. He spent all of his first professional season with Greensboro, batting .299 with four home runs and 23 RBIs in 42 games.

Attending spring training in 2014, Moran sprained the medial collateral ligament in his left knee. He began the 2014 season on the disabled list before being assigned to the Marlins' Class A Advanced affiliate Jupiter Hammerheads, in the Florida State League.

Houston Astros

On July 31, 2014, the Marlins traded Moran, Jake Marisnick, Francis Martes, and a compensatory draft pick to the Houston Astros for Jarred Cosart, Enrique Hernández, and Austin Wates. The Astros assigned Moran to the Corpus Christi Hooks of the Class AA Texas League. In 117 games between Jupiter and Corpus Christi, he batted .296/.344/.397 with seven home runs and 55 RBIs.

The Astros invited Moran to spring training in 2015. He began the season back with Corpus Christi. In May 2015, a throw hit Moran in the face that fractured his jaw, requiring surgery. He was activated later in the month, but was placed back on the disabled list on June 12. He was activated June 21. In 96 games for the Hooks, he slashed .306/.381/.459 with nine home runs and 67 RBIs.

Moran opened the 2016 season with the Fresno Grizzlies of the Class AAA Pacific Coast League. The Astros promoted him to the major leagues on May 17. Moran batted 2-for-19 (.105) before he was optioned back to Fresno. He began the 2017 season with Fresno and was promoted to the major leagues on July 18. Moran would play nine games with the Astros in 2016, compiling a .130 average and 2 RBIs. In 117 games for Fresno, he batted .259 with ten home runs and 69 RBIs.

Moran began 2017 with Fresno. He was recalled by the Astros on July 18. On July 22, Moran was injured in the sixth inning when he fouled an inside pitch from Orioles reliever Darren O'Day straight up and into the left area of his eye. Moran went down to the ground and grabbed his face, which had started to bleed. After a lengthy time down on the field with athletic trainers—including a brief moment where he attempted to stand up but couldn't – he was carted off the field. Moran suffered a facial fracture from the foul ball, and was placed on the 10-day disabled list.

The Astros finished the 2017 season with a 101–61 record and won the 2017 World Series. Moran did not play in the playoffs, but won his first championship as he was still on the team's 40-man roster at the time. In nine games for Houston, he batted .364 with one home run and three RBIs, and in 79 games for Fresno, he posted a .308 batting average with 18 home runs and 63 RBIs.

Pittsburgh Pirates
On January 13, 2018, the Astros traded Moran, Joe Musgrove, Michael Feliz, and Jason Martin to the Pittsburgh Pirates for Gerrit Cole. MLB.com ranked Moran as Pittsburgh's eighth best prospect going into the 2018 season. After the trade, Moran was named Pittsburgh's starting third baseman.

During the Pirates home opener on April 2, 2018, in his first at-bat for the Pirates at PNC Park, Moran hit his first career grand slam off of Lance Lynn. Moran finished his 2018 campaign slashing .277/.340/.407 with 11 home runs and 58 RBIs in 144 games.

In a game against the Miami Marlins on September 5, 2019, Moran faced his older brother Brian Moran in Brian's major league debut. He ended up striking out on a full-count slider against Brian. In the pandemic shortened 2020 season, Moran led the Pirates in total bases (84), home runs (10), and tied for first in RBI (23), slashing .247/.325/.472.

After the 2021 season, the Pirates designated Moran for assignment.
On November 30, Moran was non-tendered by the Pirates, making him a free agent.

Cincinnati Reds
On March 17, 2022, Moran officially signed a one-year contract with the Cincinnati Reds. He was removed from the 40-man roster and sent outright to the Triple-A Louisville Bats on June 29. On September 6, Moran was designated for assignment and was released on September 8.

Seattle Mariners
On January 10, 2023, Moran signed a minor league contract with the Seattle Mariners organization.

Personal life
Moran's brother, Brian Moran, is a professional baseball pitcher. His uncles, Rich and B. J. Surhoff, played in Major League Baseball. His grandfather, Dick Surhoff, played in the NBA with the New York Knicks.

Moran and his wife, Kelsey, married in 2017 and had their first child, a daughter in 2020.

Moran grew up a fan of the Baltimore Orioles.

References

External links

 North Carolina bio

1992 births
Living people
People from Port Chester, New York
Sportspeople from Westchester County, New York
Baseball players from New York (state)
Iona Preparatory School alumni
All-American college baseball players
Major League Baseball third basemen
Houston Astros players
Pittsburgh Pirates players
Cincinnati Reds players
North Carolina Tar Heels baseball players
Bourne Braves players
Greensboro Grasshoppers players
Jupiter Hammerheads players
Quad Cities River Bandits players
Corpus Christi Hooks players
Fresno Grizzlies players
Indianapolis Indians players